Barley End is a hamlet within the parish of Pitstone(where the 2011 Census population was included) in Buckinghamshire, England.

Hamlets in Buckinghamshire
Pitstone